Latent-transforming growth factor beta-binding protein 2 is a protein that in humans is encoded by the LTBP2 gene.

The protein encoded by this gene belongs to the family of latent transforming growth factor (TGF)-beta binding proteins (LTBP), which are extracellular matrix proteins with multi-domain structure. This protein is the largest member of the LTBP family possessing unique regions and with most similarity to the fibrillins. 

It has thus been suggested that it may have multiple functions: as a member of the TGF-beta latent complex, as a structural component of microfibrils, and a role in cell adhesion.

References

Further reading

External links
  GeneReview/NCBI/NIH/UW entry on Primary Congenital Glaucoma